Generic characters are interchangeable characters, appearing mostly in animated shows or comic strips. They often reappear at different times with different jobs, or are seen in the background. Animation or comic strip artists, when in need of a character who furthers the story without becoming part of it, often use an existing character from their repertoire instead of inventing a new one. Generics can be considered to be similar to gag characters, but might stay longer.

See also
Cartoon character
Unseen character
Osamu Tezuka's Star System
Stock character

Fictional characters by role in the narrative structure